The Journal of Grid Computing is a peer-reviewed scientific journal published by Springer Science+Business Media. According to the Journal Citation Reports, the journal has a 2010 impact factor of 1.556. The editors-in-chief are Péter Kacsuk (MTA SZTAKI Computer and Automation Research Institute, Budapest, Hungary, and the University of Westminster) and Ian Foster (Argonne National Laboratory and the University of Chicago, Illinois, USA)

Scope 
The Journal of Grid Computing covers research on technologies for collaborative work, information sharing and problem solving, and topics most commonly covered include protocols, middleware, services, security, discovery, sharing, and scaling.

References

External links 
 

Computer science journals
Quarterly journals
English-language journals
Publications established in 2003
Springer Science+Business Media academic journals